The Empire Corridor is a  passenger rail corridor in New York State running between Penn Station in New York City and . Major cities on the route include Poughkeepsie, Albany, Schenectady, Amsterdam, Utica, Syracuse, Rochester, and Buffalo. Much of the corridor was once part of the New York Central Railroad's main line.

The Lake Shore Limited follows most of the corridor from New York City, diverging west to Chicago at Buffalo–Depew station.

The Amtrak-owned section between 41st Street and the merge with the Hudson Line is unpowered and can only be served by diesel or dual-mode trains.

The corridor is also one of ten federally designated high-speed rail corridors in the United States. In the 1890s, the Empire State Express between New York City and Buffalo was about 1 hour faster than Amtrak's service in 2013.

Ownership
The Empire Corridor is largely owned by CSX Transportation (CSX), which owns most of the trackage between Niagara Falls and Poughkeepsie. Amtrak owns trackage rights for most of the Hudson line section north of Poughkeepsie to its rail yard in Albany. South of Poughkeepsie, the Empire Corridor is coextensive with Metro-North's trackage until it forks-off between Metro-North's Riverdale and Spuyten Duyvil stations in the Bronx, to cross the Harlem River over the Spuyten Duyvil Bridge and make the Empire Connection to Penn Station. Amtrak owns the trackage after that fork, the West Side Line.

The corridor had been part of the main line of the New York Central Railroad; it was the eastern leg of the NYC's famed "Water Level Route" to Chicago. The corridor passed to Penn Central in 1968 upon the NYC's merger with the Pennsylvania Railroad, and passed to Conrail in 1976. In a series of purchases in the 1980s and 1990s, Amtrak bought the Bronx–Manhattan segment, Metro-North acquired the Poughkeepsie–Bronx segment, and CSX acquired the remainder when it split Conrail's assets with Norfolk Southern, in 1999.

On October 18, 2011, Amtrak and CSX announced an agreement for Amtrak to lease, operate and maintain the CSX-owned trackage between Poughkeepsie and Schenectady. Amtrak officially assumed control of the line on December 1, 2012. Later, Amtrak bought the segment between Schenectady and Hoffmans from CSX.

Current services
The busiest segment of the Empire Corridor is between New York City and Albany with multiple trains per day.

Amtrak

The following trains operate along the varied segments of the corridor:
A section of this train splits-off at Albany–Rensselaer to serve Boston.

Commuter rail
Metro-North Railroad's Hudson Line, from Poughkeepsie, New York to Grand Central Terminal, New York, comprises the corridor between Poughkeepsie to south of Riverdale.

Freight service
Freight service is provided by CSX Transportation.

Stations
All stations are in the state of New York.

See also
 New York high-speed rail
 High-speed rail in the United States
 West Side Line

References

External links
 Empire Corridor, New York State Department of Transportation
 Empire Corridor section of the Federal Railroad Administration website

Rail infrastructure in New York (state)
High-speed railway lines in the United States